Christiane Geerts is a former Belgian racing cyclist. She won the Belgian national road race title in 1967.

Career
Geerts competed in the Cycling World Championships three times between 1966 and 1970. She placed 14th in the Women's Road Race in both 1966 and 1967, however her best result was an 8th place in the same event in 1970.

References

External links
 

Year of birth missing (living people)
Living people
Belgian female cyclists
Place of birth missing (living people)
People from Ninove
Cyclists from East Flanders